Here to Heart is a 2018 Chinese television series starring Hans Zhang, Janine Chang, Jing Chao and Jenny Zhang. It is based on the novel The Warm Chord by An Ning. It airs on Hunan TV from April 30 to May 26, 2018.

Synopsis
Zhan Nanxian is a sharp young man who was able to foresee the technological boom. He collaborated with his classmates to create a company and was able to weather the storm despite only 10% chance of success. Wen Nuan is an accomplished career woman who quits her high-paying job in England to work with Nanxian as his executive assistant. They were a couple previously and Wen Nuan is determined not only to help Nanxian at work, but also to rekindle the love that they have lost. This story is about the endless journey of love, and  the two hearts lost and rekindled after 7 years of separation.

Cast

Main
 Hans Zhang plays Zhan Nanxian, CEO of Qianyu Company, a nominal  boyfriend of Bo Yixin, he ended up living with Wen Nuan.
 Yao Junzhe as young Zhan.
 Janine Chang as Wen Nuan, a staff member in Qianyu Company, a nominal girlfriend of Zhu Linlu, she ends up living with Zhan Nanxian.
 Wang Zixuan as young Wen. 
 Jing Chao as Zhu Linlu, a nominal boyfriend of Wen Nuan.
 Lin Yongju as young Zhu.
 Jenny Zhang as Bo Yixin, an actress, a nominal girlfriend of Zhan Nanxian, finally living with Pan Wei Ning.
 Shang Siqi as young Bo.

Supporting
 Jie Bing as Zhu Yi
 Zheng Xiaozhong as Zhu Ze
 Qiang Yu as Zhu Linghong.
 Zhou Qiqi as Wen Rou, elder sister of Wen Nuan.
 Jin Zehao as Guan Ti, founder of Qianyu Company, Zhan Nanxian's close friend, he loves Ding Xiaodai.
 Ji Xiaobing as Gao Fang, founder of Qianyu Company, Zhan Nanxian's close friend.
 Guo Zi Qian as Ding Xiaodai, a staff member in Qianyu Company, secretary of Zhan Nanxian.
 Joy Pan as Zhan Nanxian's mother.
 Ma Qiuzi as Du Xintong, a staff member in Qianyu Company.
 Chen Weidong as Guo Ruqian, Du Xintong's husband.
 Liang Dawei as Pan Wei'an
 Li Xinzhe as Liu Rui, assistant of Wen Rou.
 Cai Gang as Leng Rufeng

Music

Production
Jumei Film and TV Media Co.,Ltd and Shanghai Guanda Film and Television Culture Co., Ltd. bought the television series rights to the 2008 novel Here to Heart written by An Ning.

On June 13, 2017, Huang Xiaoming announced that he was cast in the series on his Sina Weibo, but was later replaced by Hans Zhang.

Production started in June 2017 and ended on November 22, 2017. Most of the series was shot on location in Shanghai and London.

The series marked the third collaboration between Hans Zhang and Janine Chang. They had worked previously on Fairytale (2012) and The Four (2015).

Ratings

Reception
Here to Heart was well received when it premiered in Hunan Television. The series was ranked first in the ratings on May 8, 2018.
As of May 9, 2018, Here to Heart has 1.5 billion viewers. On May 11, the series has been watched 2 billion times.

References

External links
 

2018 Chinese television series debuts
2018 Chinese television series endings
Television shows based on Chinese novels
Chinese romance television series